Diana Ringo (born 8 March 1992) is a Finnish film director, composer and visual artist. Her director debut is dystopian feature film drama Quarantine (2021)  which was shortlisted for the 2022 Golden Globes as a foreign entry. She was also composer of the film and for the film's score she wrote 26 original tracks.

In November 2022 it was announced that her feature film based on George Orwell's dystopian novel Nineteen Eighty-Four will be released in spring 2023.

Her music for the film Million Loves in Me by Sampson Yuen won the award for the Best Original Score at the LAFA Awards in 2020. She also composed the score for the Santa Monica College short film Hinge by Lisa Mayo in 2019.

Diana was born in the family of Finnish researcher Reijo Mononen and Russian-Finnish artist Elena Ringo. Her great-grandfathers are inventor Josef Ringo and mathematician Sergey Nikolsky. Diana grew up in Helsinki and was interested in music since early childhood.  At the age of five, pianist Dmitry Soloviev, discovered that Diana has perfect pitch. She started to study piano and Soloviev became her first music teacher.

She studied piano with famous pianists such as Janne Mertanen, Risto Lauriala. She has attended master classes by the Hollywood composer Lalo Schifrin, directors Paul Verhoeven and David Lynch.

Diana Ringo is a classically educated pianist. Her original compositions combine classical and romantic influences with modern electronics and synthesizers. Her favorite classical composers are Bach, Beethoven and Chopin. Film score composers whose works have influenced Diana Ringo include Ennio Morricone, Dmitri Shostakovich, Michel Legrand, Giorgio Moroder and Lalo Schifrin.

In 2020 Diana Ringo was the first Finnish woman to pose in the Playboy Spain magazine.

As a visual artist and painter, Diana works with oil, gouache, digital techniques, collage and mixed media.

Awards
Best Score - Hinge (Vienna Independent Film Festival 2019)
Best Score - Million Loves in Me (Los Angeles Film Awards 2020)
Best Score - Million Loves in Me (WICA Los Angeles 2021)
Best Visual Effects or Design - Quarantine (ES Europe International Film Festival 2021)

References

External links

Finnish film directors
Finnish women film directors
Finnish film producers
Finnish women film producers
Finnish film score composers
Women film score composers
Neoclassical composers
Finnish pianists
Finnish women pianists
Finnish classical pianists
Finnish keyboardists
Women keyboardists
Avant-garde keyboardists
Avant-garde pianists
21st-century women composers
21st-century classical composers
Finnish women classical composers
Finnish electronic musicians
Contemporary classical music performers
Finnish female models
Playboy people
Living people
1992 births
20th-century Finnish composers
21st-century Finnish composers
Finnish painters
Finnish women painters
21st-century Finnish painters
Pop artists
21st-century women pianists